Wyższa Szkoła Biznesu – National-Louis University (WSB-NLU) — non-public university, one of the first non-public higher education schools in Poland. It offers first and second degree studies in computer science, management, psychology, as well as post-graduate studies, including MBA program. Since 2022, it offres law studies. WSB-NLU was the first university in Poland to offer an American diploma of Bachelor of Arts in addition to the Polish diploma and the first to offer its students a virtual dean's office and an electronic student record book.

Authorities 

President: Krzysztof Pawłowski, Ph.D.
Rector: Dariusz Woźniak, Ph.D.
Vicerector: Michał Jasiński, Ph.D.
Dean: Jerzy Choroszczak, Ph.D.
Vicedean: Krzysztof Przybycień, Ph.D.
Chancellor: mgr Przemysław Bochenek, M.A.
Executive Director: Sławomir Piętka, M.A.
Quasteor: Dorota Knopf, M.A.

History 

 1 October 1991 - Wyższa Szkoła Biznesu starts its activity as Sądecko-Podhalańska Szkoła Biznesu.
 8 May 1992 – signing an agreement with National-Louis University from Chicago; as a result WSB-NLU is established, offering the program of studies given by NLU.
 30 September 1992 - Minister of National Education, professor Andrzej Stelmachowski orders to enter Wyższa Szkoła Biznesu – National Louis University in Nowy Sącz in the register of non-public universities. WSB-NLU – is granted the authorization to offer first degree (licencjat) studies in Management and Marketing.
 1993 – purchasing the building at ul. Zielona 27 in Nowy Sącz, together with the Stadnicki Palace in Nawojowa, it becomes the main building of the university.
 October 1993 – cooperation agreement between Craig School of Business California State University (USA) and WSB-NLU (grants for full lecture courses run by American professors for WSB-NLU students and for staff development and internships).
 May 1995 – signing an agreement with Maastricht School of Management on offering a joint program of Master of Business Administration.
 May 1995 – for the first time WSB-NLU wins the „Wprost” ranking for non-public universities, in Business Studies category it comes second after Warsaw School of Economics, ahead of all Polish universities and business schools.
 1997 - WSB-NLU is the first university in Poland to receive an accreditation of the Association of Management Education SEM FORUM. 
 1998 – the university is given the Minister's authorization to grant its graduates the degree of magister (Master's degree) in Management and Marketing.
 1999 – the Minister's acceptance of a new field of study at a first degree level 0 Computer Science.
 25 September 1999 – the Monument of a Graduate is unveiled – a sculpture by Andrzej Pasoń.
 4 November 1999 – signing an agreement with NLU, thanks to which NCA accreditation covers two first degree programs: Management and Marketing and Computer Science – their graduates, apart from the Polish licencjat title also receive its American counterpart – the Bachelor of Arts degree.
 Polish Prime Minister Jerzy Buzek hands in the Pro Publico Bono award to Rector Krzysztof Pawłowski for the best civic initiative in the first decade of free Poland.
 2000 – the university is among other schools receiving the Microsoft Certified Professional certificate. Thanks to the agreement with Microsoft, WSB-NLU students are given an opportunity of obtaining an MCP title in one of three categories: Systems Engineer, Programmer and Database Administrator.
 2002 – another didactic premise is opened – building C, together with a library and an electronic reading room.
 9 November 2002 – the board of Kisiel's Award granted by Wprost weekly announces that Krzysztof Pawłowski, rector of WSB-NLU is its laureate this year.
 2002 – authorization to run first degree studies in Political Science – previously courses in Political Science, History, Philosophy and International Relations were offered as general education courses in Marketing and Management and Computer Studies.
 2002 – offering studies in Management run exclusively in English.
 November 2003 – cooperation agreement with DePaul University (Chicago). Within this cooperation, WSB-NLU offers 2-year studies in Computer Science, graduates obtain a diploma of Master of Science in Computer Science.
 2003 – school premises are expanded with a sports hall and a multi-purpose sports field.
 2004 – Krzysztof Pawłowski becomes an Entrepreneur of the Year in a contest organized by Ernst & Young.
 June 2005 – WSB-NLU hosts the final tournament of the 17th International IT Competition.
 2005 – WSB-NLU is granted a permission to offer uniform, Master's degree studies in Psychology.
 2007 - WSB-NLU starts cooperation with Google.
 September 2007 – WSB-NLU is authorized to offer complementary, second degree studies in Political Science.
 March 2009 - DRIMAGINE – the first school of animation and 3D graphics opens at our university, supported by an Oscar-winner, Zbigniew Rybczyński.
 October 2011 - Drimagine Academy moves to Warsaw
 December 2011 - WSB-NLU has a new owner - "Agreement for the future of WSB-NLU", composed of Polish Capital and Energy Group SA, Consortium of Universities Futurus and Consortium of Non-Public Universities E-University
2015 - establishment of the WSB-NLU Institute of Diagnostics, Counseling and Psychological Support.
2016 - Establishment of the Center for Research and Programming - an internal unit of WSB-NLU, which develops all kinds of IT projects for education, higher education and business .
2018 International Library Conference, entitled: "Library of the Future".
2020 Opening of the External Branch in  Racibórz.  
2020 Recommendation given to the CLoud Academy system by the Ministry of Science and Higher Education as a system adapted to remote student learning [1].
2020 Creation of a specialized unit for popularization of studies in the RealTime Online model - UNIVERSITY OF VIRTUAL EDUCATION (UNIWERSYTET WIRTUALNEJ EDUKACJI)
2021 Opening of the University Branch in Kielce.

Types and fields of study 
The university offers full-time studies in Polish in the following majors: Psychology, Computer Science,  Management and Law. 

Full-time studies are conducted only in the premises of the University in Nowy Sacz.

References

See also 
 National-Louis University

Business schools in Poland
Universities and colleges in Poland
Nowy Sącz
Educational institutions established in 1991
National Louis University
1991 establishments in Poland